Phillip Alexander Glasser (born October 4, 1978) is an American producer and a former actor. He is best known for providing the voice of Fievel Mousekewitz in An American Tail and its sequel An American Tail: Fievel Goes West.

Selected filmography

Actor

Producer

References

External links

1978 births
20th-century American male actors
21st-century American male actors
American male film actors
American male television actors
American male child actors
Film producers from California
American male voice actors
Living people
People from Tarzana, Los Angeles
Male actors from Los Angeles